The men's team archery event at the 2011 Pan American Games was held between October 17–21 at the Pan American Archery Stadium in Guadalajara. The defending Pan American Games champion was Brady Ellison, Butch Johnson and Vic Wunderle of the United States.

Schedule
All times are Central Standard Time (UTC-6).

Results

Qualification
27 competitors from 9 nations competed.

Elimination rounds

References

Archery at the 2011 Pan American Games